Wilson Ávila (born 19 April 1960) is a Bolivian footballer. He played in seven matches for the Bolivia national football team from 1985 to 1987. He was also part of Bolivia's squad for the 1987 Copa América tournament.

References

External links
 

1960 births
Living people
Association football defenders
Bolivian footballers
Bolivia international footballers
People from Vallegrande Province